This is a list of official state (and FCT) party organizations of the Peoples Democratic Party.

State organizations

Notes

References